Club Single is an EP by German gothic metal band The Vision Bleak, released on 23 July 2007, through Prophecy Productions. It was intended to be a teaser for the band's then-upcoming studio album The Wolves Go Hunt Their Prey, released one month later on 31 August and features two tracks that would ultimately appear on the album, plus other two taken from their older releases Carpathia: A Dramatic Poem and The Deathship Has a New Captain. As evidenced by its title, the EP was given by Prophecy exclusively for members of its club; thus being, it is not available for sale, and is currently out of print.

Track listing

Personnel

The Vision Bleak
 Ulf Theodor Schwadorf (Markus Stock) – guitars, bass
 Allen B. Konstanz (Tobias Schönemann) – vocals, drums

Miscellaneous staff
 Martin Koller – production

References

External links
 The Vision Bleak's official website

The Vision Bleak albums
2007 EPs
Fan-club-release albums